Jolene Creighton (born 1985) is an American journalist and media executive. She was the Founding Editor-in-Chief of the science news site Futurism, which grew to more than 20 million monthly readers. In 2017, Creighton co-Founded Gravity Products, a subsidiary of Futurism. The company's inaugural product, The Gravity Blanket, pioneered the weighted blanket movement and raised over 4.7 million dollars. Creighton became the Editor-in-Chief of the science and technology news site Interesting Engineering in December 2020.

Early life and education 
Creighton attended Waterloo High School in Waterloo, New York. She studied English at Keuka College and graduated magna cum laude in 2004. She earned a master of arts degree from SUNY Brockport in 2011, where her thesis focused on digital media, viral storytelling, and the culture industry.

In 2014, Creighton’s pit bull achieved viral fame after Creighton uploaded a video of the dog barking apprehensively at a pineapple. After the video went viral, Creighton noted that the dog was a stray and used the story to advocate for spaying, neutering, and adoption in press. "Ultimately, that night I found Stella, she wasn't alone. Not really. There are a million more animals out there who still need someone. In fact, there's more than a million," Creighton said.

Career 
Creighton began her career as an instructor at the University of Southern Mississippi, where she taught courses on English and writing. In 2012, she co-founded the science news site From Quarks to Quasars, which was acquired in 2015. Creighton left academia and fully transitioned to journalism later in 2015, when she helped launch Futurism and joined the team as the Founding Editor-in-Chief. The publication secured an average of 20 million monthly readers and 100 million monthly video views by April 2017.

In November of 2017, at the height of the Me Too Movement, Futurism was pulled into controversy when it came to light that the publication had a promotional partnership with George Takei, who had recently faced sexual misconduct allegations. Creighton announced that the publication had severed all ties with Takei. "Futurism holds itself and all its partners to the highest ethical standards, and we were unsettled to learn about the recent allegations against George Takei,” Creighton said. “We are no longer pursuing a relationship with him or his distribution channels.”  In April of 2017, Creighton helped launch The Gravity Blanket with Futurism and raised more than $4.7 million dollars in crowdfunding. The product was ultimately credited with launching the weighted blanket movement, and was eventually spun off into a Futurism subsidiary, Gravity Products.

Futurism was acquired by Singularity University in 2019 for an undisclosed sum. In December of 2020, Interesting Engineering announced that Creighton would be joining as Editor-in-Chief. In February of 2021, Gravity Products was acquired for an undisclosed sum to Win Brands Group.

Selected publications

References 

1985 births
Living people
American journalists
American science writers